The 2012 Glynhill Ladies International was held from January 20 to 22 at the Braehead Curling Rink in Glasgow, Scotland as part of the 2011–12 World Curling Tour. The purse for the event was GBP£8,000, and the winner, Mirjam Ott, received GBP£2,500. The event was held in a round robin format with a consolation round and playoffs.

Teams

Round-robin standings
Final round-robin standings

Consolation round

Playoffs

References

External links

Official site

Glynhill Ladies International
Glynhill Ladies International
Glynhill Ladies International
Women's curling competitions in Scotland
International sports competitions in Glasgow